This is a list of castles in France, arranged by Region and Department.

Notes
 The French word château has a wider meaning than the English castle: it includes architectural entities that are properly called palaces, mansions or vineyards in English. This list focuses primarily on architectural entities that may be properly termed castle or fortress, and excludes entities not built around a substantial older castle that is still evident.
 Occasionally, where there is not a specific article on a castle, links are given to another article that includes details, typically an article on a town.
 Italics indicate links to articles in the French Wikipedia.
 If no article appears in either English or French Wikipedias, a link is given to an external website.
 The number in parentheses after the name of each department indicates the department number used for administrative purposes.
 The number of castles in France is estimated to about 45,000, a bit more than 1 for France's 36,000 communities.

Grand Est

 Ardennes (08)

Donjon de Day
 Doumely
 Hierges
 Lamecourt
 Landreville
 L'Échelle
 Lumes
 Montcornet
 Neufmanil
 Remilly-les-Pothées
 Rocan
 Sedan
 Tassigny

 Aube (10)

Arrentières
 Bar sur Seine
 Bucey-en-Othe
 Chacenay
 Droupt-Saint-Basle
 Jaucourt (chapel)
 Ricey-Bas
 Saint-Lyé (Evêques de Troyes)
 Vanlay
 Vendeuvre-sur-Barse

 Haute-Marne (52)

Lafauche
 Vignory

 Marne (51)

Lagery
 Montmort
 Troissy
 Vienne-le-Château

 Meurthe-et-Moselle (54)

Bainville-aux-Miroirs
 Blamont
 Cons-la-Grandville
Dieulouard
 Jaulny
 Longwy
 Mousson
 Moyen
 Nomeny
 Pierrefort
 Pierre-Percée
 Prény
 Vaudémont

 Meuse (55)

Gombervaux
 Hattonchâtel

 Moselle (57)

Alteville
 Ancerville
 Bitche
 Blettange
 Buy
 Comtes de Luxembourg
 Créhange
 Dabo
 Ducs de Lorraine (Sierck)
 Falkenstein
 Fénétrange
 Frauenberg
 Gendersberg
 Geroldseck
 Grand-Arnsbourg
 Helfedange
 Helfenstein
 Hingsange
 Hombourg-Budange
 Hombourg-Haut
 Lorraine
 Luttange
 Lutzelbourg
 Malbrouck
 Marimont
 Mouterhouse
 Ottange
 Philippsfels
 Ramstein
 Rodemack
 Rothenbourg
 Roussy-Seigneurie
 Saint-Sixte
 Sarrebourg
 Schlossberg
 Turquestein
 Vry
 Waldeck
 Warsberg
 Weckerburg
 Weidesheim
 Woippy
 Xouaxange

 Bas-Rhin (67)

Andlau
 Bernstein
 Birkenfels
 Châtenois
 Dreistein
 Fleckenstein
 Frankenbourg
 Freudeneck
 Frœnsbourg
 Grand-Geroldseck
 Greifenstein
 Guirbaden
 Hagelschloss
 Haut-Barr or Hohbarr
 Haut-Kœnigsbourg
 Herrenstein
 Hohenbourg
 Hohenfels
 Hohenstein
 des Ifs
 Kagenfels
 Kintzheim
 Landsberg
 Lichtenberg
 Lœwenstein
 Lutzelbourg
 Lutzelhardt
 Nideck
 Nouveau-Windstein
 Oberhof
 Ochsenstein
 Osthoffen
 l'Ortenbourg
 Ottrott
 Petit-Arnsberg
 Petite-Pierre
 Petit-Geroldseck
 Ramstein
 Ringelstein (Grand)
 Ringelstein (Petit)
 la Roche
 Rohan (Mutzig)  
 Saint-Rémy d'Altenstadt
 Salm
 Schœneck
 Spesbourg
 Vieux-Windstein
 Wangen
 Wangenbourg
 Wasenbourg
 Wasigenstein
 Wineck
 Wittschloessel

 Haut-Rhin (68)

Altkirch
 Aspach-le-Haut
 Bilstein
 Burgstall 
 Buchenek
 Butenheim
 Dagsbourg
 Echery
 Ferrette
 Freundstein
 Girsberg
 Hagueneck
 Hartmannswiller
 Hattstatt-Schauenbourg
 Haut-Ribeaupierre
 Heidwiller
 Hohenack 
 Hohlandsbourg
 Hugstein
 Kaysersberg
 Landskron
 Lupfen-Schwendi
 Meywhir
 Morimont
 Orschwihr
 Pflixbourg
 Saint-Léon 
 Saint-Ulrich
 Stoerenbourg
 Wagenbourg
 Weckmund
 Wildenstein
 Wineck 

 Vosges (88)

Bruyères
 Châtel-sur-Moselle
 Épinal
 Fontenoy-le-Château
 Saint-Jean-du-Marché

(→Top)

Nouvelle-Aquitaine

 Charente (16)

Angoulême
 Baneuil
 Barbezieux
 Bouteville
 Brigueuil
 Chillac
 Cognac
 Confolens
 Gourville
 Jarnac
 Marthon
 Montbron
 Montignac-Charente
 L'Oisellerie
 Richemont
 Rochebrune
 La Rochefoucauld
 Verteuil
 Villebois-Lavalette

 Charente-Maritime (17)

Aulnay
 Broue
 Fouras
 l'Isleau
 Montendre
 Montguyon
 Nieul-lès-Saintes
 Pons
 Rioux
 La Rochecourbon
 Saint-Jean-d'Angle
 Saint-Sauvant
 Taillebourg
 Vauclair
 Villeneuve-la-Comtesse

 Corrèze (19)

la Johannie
 Merle
 Plas
 Saint-Hilaire
 Turenne
 Ventadour

 Creuse (23)

Clairavaux (Puyravaux)
 Crozant
 Saint-Germain-Beaupré

 Deux-Sèvres (79)

Airvault
 Bressuire
 La Chapelle-Bertrand
 Cherveux
 Coudray-Salbart
 la Guyonnière
 Javarzay
 Mursay
 Niort
 Olbreuse
 Parthenay
 Sanzay
 Saint-Mesmin

 Dordogne (24)

Agonac
 Auberoche
 Aucors
 Bayac
 Bellegarde
 Beynac
 Biron
 Bourdeilles
 Bridoire
 Brieudet
 Bruzac
 Castelnaud-la-Chapelle
 Chaban
 La Chapelle-Faucher
 Clérans
 Commarque
 Condat
 Excideuil
 Eymet
 Faye (Auriac-du-Périgord)
 Frugie
 Gageac
 la Grande Filolie
 l'Herm
 la Jarthe
 Losse
 Jumilhac
 Lalinde
 Lanmary
 Lieu-Dieu
 Mareuil
 Mavaleix
 Milandes
 Montaigne
 Montcigoux
 Montfort
 Montréal
 Puymartin
 Rognac
 Saint-Germain
 Salignac
 Sauvebœuf (Aubas)
 Tayac
 Vaucocour
 Vieillecour

 Gironde (33)

Blanquefort
 la Brède 
 Budos
 Cazeneuve
 Curton
 Faugas
 de Francs
 Guilleragues
 Hâ (Bordeaux)
 Hamel
 Lagorce
 Langoiran
 Lavison
 Lormont
 Quat'Sos (La Réole)
 Rauzan
 Roquetaillade
 Tardes
 la Trave
 Villandraut

 Haute-Vienne (87)

Châlucet
 Châlus-Chabrol
 Château-Chervix
 Bonneval
 Lastours
 Montbrun
 Rochechouart

 Landes (40)

Caumale
 Labrit
 Lacataye
 Montbron
 Montréal (Peyrehorade)
 Nolibos

 Lot-et-Garonne (47)

Barbaste
 Beauville
 Bonaguil
 Buzet
 Cuzorn
 Duras
 Le Fréchou
 Gavaudun
 Lagrange-Monrepos
 Madaillan
 Montluc
 Nérac
 Sauveterre (Château des Rois ducs)
 Xaintrailles

 Pyrénées-Atlantiques (64)

Bellocq 
 Belzunce
 Bidache
 Château-vieux
 Labastide-Villefranche
 Mauléon
 Moncade
 Montaner
 Morlanne
 Pau
 Ruthie

 Vienne (86)

Angles-sur-l'Anglin
 la Bonnetière
 Chambonneau
 Cujalais
 Dissay
 le Fou
 Gençay
 Lusignan
 Masseuil
 la Mothe-Chandeniers
 Ranton 
 Saint-Cassien
 Ternay
 Touffou

(→Top)

Auvergne-Rhône-Alpes

 Ain (01)

des Allymes
 Barre
 la Bâtie
 Châtillon-sur-Chalaronne
 Cordon
 Fort l'Écluse
 Montribloud
 Poncin
 Trévoux

 Allier (03)

Billy
 Busset
 Chouvigny
 Gannat
 la Lande
 Montgilbert
 la Palice
 Thoury

 Ardèche (07)

Aubenas (or Montlaur)
 Boulogne
 Chambonas
 Crussol
 Largentière
 la Tourette
 Maisonseule
 des Moines
 Tournon
 Vaussèche
 Ventadour
 Vogüé

 Cantal (15)

Alleuze
 Anjony 
 Branzac
 Carbonat
 Celles
 Conros
 Couffour
 Crèvecœur
 Pesteils
 Réquistat
 Val
 Vieillevie
 Vixouze

 Drôme (26)

Adhémar
 Albon
 Allan
 Chabrillan
 Chamaret
 Crest
 Grâne
 Grignan
 Ratières
 Rochechinard
 Rochefort-en-Valdaine
 Suze-la-Rousse

 Haute-Loire (43)

Allègre
 Arlempdes
 Artias
 Auzon
 Beaufort
 Bosbomparent
 Chalencon
 Chavaniac
 Domeyrat
 Polignac
 Rochebaron
 Saint-Ilpize
 Saint Romain (at Siaugues-Sainte-Marie)

 Haute-Savoie (74)

Allinges (neuf)
 Allinges (vieux)
 Annecy
 Beauregard
 Bonneville
 Dingy
 Faucigny
 Langin
 Larringes
 Menthon-Saint-Bernard
 Montrottier
 Ripaille
 La Roche-sur-Foron
 Sales
 Sallenôves
 Thorens

 Isère (38)

Alba
 Arthaudière
 Bayard (Pontcharra)
 Bouquéron
 Clermont
 Fallavier
 Fayet
 Septème
 La Sône
 Virieu

 Loire (42)

Barollière
 Beauregard
 Chalmazel
 Couzan
 Essalois
 Grangent
 Montrond
 Rapetour
 La Roche
 Rochetaillée
 Trolanderie
 Virieu

 Puy-de-Dôme (63)

Aulteribe
 Bostfranchet
 Château-Dauphin
 Chazeron
 Cordès
 Grange Fort
 Montpensier
 Murol
 Opme
 Randan
 Ravel
 Rocher
 Tournoël
 Viverols

 Rhône (69)

Bagnols
 Chamelet
 Chances
 Châtillon-d'Azergues
 Chazay
 Corcelles-en-Beaujolais
 Francheville
 Irigny
 Jarnioux
 Joux
 Lissieu
 Montmelas
 Oingt
 Pusignan
 Saint-Cyr
 Sou
 Ternand

 Savoie (73)

La Bâtie-Seyssel
 Beaufort
 Bourdeau
 Briançon
 Chantemerle
 Charbonnières
 Châtillon
 Chevron
 Cornillon
 ducs de Savoie (Chambery)
 La Forest
 Les Marches
 Miolans
 Montcharvin
 Saint-Michel-de-Maurienne
 La Salle
 Thomas II
 Tournon

(→Top)

Brittany

 Côtes-d'Armor (22)

Dinan
 Fort-la-Latte
 Le Guildo
 La Hunaudaye
 Montafilan
 Pierre II (Guingamp)
 La Roche-Jagu
 Tonquédec

 Finistère (29)

Bertheaume
 Brest
 Kérouzéré
 Rustéphan
 Trémazan

 Ille-et-Vilaine (35)

Bonnefontaine
 Combourg
 Fougères
 Saint-Malo
 Solidor Tower
 Vitré

 Morbihan (56)

Comper
 Josselin
 Largoët
 Plessis-Josso
 Ducs des Rohan (Pontivy)
 Suscinio
 Trécesson

(→Top)

Bourgogne-Franche-Comté

 Côte-d'Or (21)

Auxonne
 Bussy-Rabutin
 Châteauneuf
 Commarin
 Éguilly
 Époisses
 Frôlois
 Gevrey-Chambertin
 Mâlain
 Mont-Saint-Jean
 Montfort
 Posanges
 La Rochepot
 Rosières
 Savigny
 Semur-en-Auxois
 Thil

 Doubs (25)

Belvoir
 Besançon
 Cléron
 Fort de Joux
 Montbéliard
 Montfaucon

 Haute-Saône (70)

Étobon
 Oricourt
 Ray-sur-Saône

 Jura (39)

Arlay
 Chevreaux
 Frontenay
 la Muyre
 Oliferne
 Pymont

 Nièvre (58)

Bazoches
 Chandioux 
 Chassy (Montreuillon)
 Chevenon
 Corbelin
 Moulins-Engilbert
 Passy-les-Tours
 Villars
 Villemolin

 Saône-et-Loire (71)

Arcy
 Balleure
 Bissy-sur-Fley
 Berzé
 Bouttavant
 Brancion
 Brandon
 Bresse-sur-Grosne
 Champsigny
 Charolles
 Chassy
 Châteauneuf
 Chazeu
 Chevannes
 Commune
 Corcelle
 Couches
 Dyo
 Épinac
 Igé
 Igornay
 Layé
 Leynes
 Lugny
 Marcilly-la-Gueurce
 Marigny (Fleurville)
 Marigny
 Montaigu
 Montcony
 Nobles
 Ozenay
 Le Parc
 Pierreclos
 Rully
 Saint-Huruge
 La Salle
 Savigny-sur-Grosne
 Semur-en-Brionnais
 Sercy
 Sigy-le-Châtel
 La Tour du Bost
 Vautheau

 Territoire de Belfort (90)

Belfort
 Rosemont
 Rougemont

 Yonne (89)

 Chastellux
 Druyes
 Guédélon
 Jully
 Noyers
 Pisy
 Ragny
 Saint-Fargeau

(→Top)

Centre-Val de Loire

 Cher (18)

Ainay-le-Vieil
 Bannegon
 Culan
 Font-Moreau (Poul)
 Grand-Besse
 Jouy
 Mehun-sur-Yèvre
 Montrond
 Pesselières
 Sagonne
 Sancerre

 Eure-et-Loir (28)

Anet
 Baronville
 Châteaudun
 Courtalain
 Dreux
 Levesville
 Maintenon
 Saint-Jean (Nogent-le-Rotrou)

 Indre (36)

Azay-le-Ferron
 Brosse
 Ingrandes
 Mont (le)
 Sarzay
 Valençay

 Indre-et-Loire (37)

Amboise
 Celle-Guenand
 Chenonceau
 Chinon
 Cinq-Mars-la-Pile
 Gizeux
 Guerche (la)
 Langeais
 Loches
 Luynes
 Montbazon
 Montpoupon
 Montrésor
 Le Rivau
 Tours
 Ussé
 Vaujours

 Loir-et-Cher (41)

Chaumont-sur-Loire
 Fougères-sur-Bièvre
 Lavardin
 Matval
 Montoire-sur-le-Loir
 Montrichard
 le Moulin
 Vendôme

 Loiret (45)

Beaugency
 Bellegarde
 Chamerolles
 Châteaurenard 
 Châtillon-Coligny 
 du Hallier
 Meung-sur-Loire
 Sully-sur-Loire
 Yèvre-le-Châtel

(→Top)

Corsica
 Corse-du-Sud (2A)

-

 Haute-Corse (2B)

-

(→Top)

Île-de-France

 Paris (75)

The Bastille
 La Conciergerie
 Le Louvre
 The Temple

 Seine-et-Marne (77)

Blandy-les-Tours
 Brie-Comte-Robert
 Diant
 Épernon
 la Grange-Bléneau
 du Houssoy
 Moret
 Montaiguillon
 Nangis
 Nantouillet
 Nemours
 Tour César (Provins)
 Sigy

 Yvelines (78)

Beynes
 Donjon de Houdan
 La Madeleine (Chevreuse)
 Donjon de Maurepas
 Montfort
 Villiers-le-Mahieu
 Essonne (91)

Dourdan
 Étampes 
 Montlhéry

 Hauts-de-Seine (92)

-

 Seine-Saint-Denis (93)

-

 Val-de-Marne (94)

 Vincennes

 Val-d'Oise (95)

Beaumont-sur-Oise
 La Roche-Guyon

(→Top)

Occitanie 

 Ariège (09)

Foix
 Gudanes
 Lagarde
 Mirabat
 Miglos
 Montaillou
 Montségur
 Roquefixade
 Seix
 Usson

 Aude (11)

Aguilar
 Arques
 Arzens
 Auriac
 Bézu
 Tour Barberousse (Gruissan)
 Carcassonne
 Ducs de Joyeuse
 Durban
 Durfort
 Gaussan
 Lastours
 Miramont
 Niort-de-Sault
 Padern
 Peyrepertuse
 Pieusse
 Puilaurens
 Puivert
 Quéribus
 Saint-Ferriol
 Saint Martin de Toques
 Saissac
 Termes
 Villerouge-Termenès

 Aveyron (12)

Castles in Aveyron [This article includes Bourines, Colombier, Estaing, Ginals, Inférieur, Loupiac, Marinesque, Mas Rougier, Masse, Méjanel, Mélac, Montarnal, Montjaux, Mostuéjouls, Pagax, la Pèze, Recoules, Roquelaure, Salvagnac-Cajarc, Sénergues, Tholet, Toulonjac, Valon, Versols]
 Belcastel
 Calmont d'Olt
 Coupiac
 Fayet
 Inférieur
 Latour-sur-Sorgues
 Montaigut
 Najac
 Peyrelade
 Pruines
 Saint-Côme-d'Olt
 Saint-Izaire
 la Servayrie
 Sévérac
 Vézins

 Gard (30)

Aiguèze
 Allègre
 Beaucaire
 Brésis
Montdardier
 Fort Saint-André 
 Portes
 Rousson
 Saint-Chaptes
 Uzès
 Vissec

 Gers (32)

Castles in Gers [This article includes Avensac, Balarin, Bassoues, Beaumont, Berrac, Bivès, Cassaigne, Castelmore, Castéra-Lectourois, Castet-Arrouy, Courrensan, Epas, Esclignac, Garranée, Gimbrède, Homps, Lagardère, Larroque-Engalin, Lasserre, Leberon, L'Isle-Bouzon, Maniban, Mansencôme, Mazères, la Mothe, Mothes, Pouypardin, Pouylebon, Pouy-Roquelaure, Pujos, Sainte-Gemme, Saint-Georges, Saint-Lary, Saint-Martin-d'Armagnac, Savignac, Sempesserre, Sérillac, Tauzia]
 Bouvées
 Flamarens
 Herrebouc
 Homps
 Lacassagne
 Larressingle
 Lasserre
 Mérens
 Sainte-Mère
 Terraube
 Thibault de Termes

 Haute-Garonne (31)

Aurignac
 Berthier
 Boussan
 Brax
 Calmont
 Cambiac
 Castagnac
 Fourquevaux
 Galié
 Jean
 Labastide-Paumès
 Laréole
 Larroque 
 Latoue
 Launac
 Montespan
 Pibrac
 Rudelle
 Saint-Béat
 Saint-Élix-le-Château
 Saint-Élix-Séglan
 Sainte-Marie
 Saint-Félix-Lauragais
 Saint-Jory
 Saint-Paul-d'Oueil
 Salvetat-Saint-Gilles
 Sarremezan
 Vallègue
 Vieillevigne
 Villefranche

 Hautes-Pyrénées (65)

Beaucens
 Bordères-Louron
 Comtes de Comminges
 Estarvielle
 Génos
 Horgues
 Lourdes
 Mauvezin
 Moulor
 Sainte-Marie
 Tramezaygues

 Hérault (34)

Castles in Hérault [This article includes Agel, Aigues-Vives, Aspiran de Ravanès (Thézan-Lès-Béziers), Aumelas, Autignac, Bélarga, Cabrerolles, Cabrières, Castelnau-de-Guers, Creissan, Cruzy, Dio, Faugères, Fos, Grézan (Laurens), Malavieille, Margon, Marsillargues, Mazers (Fontės), Montouliers, Mourcairol, Pézènes-les-Mines, Puisserguier, Saint-Bauléry (Cébazan)] 
 Bélarga
 Ganges
 Guilhem (Clermont-l'Hérault)
 Pézenas
 Pézènes
 Roquessels
 Saint-Maurice 
 Valros
 Vendres

 Lot (46)

des Anglais (Autoire)
 des Anglais (Brengues)
 Béduer
 du Bousquet
 Cabrerets
 Caïx
 Calamane
 Capdenac
 Castelnau-Bretenoux
 Castelnau-Montratier
 Cénevières
 Charry
 Clermont
 Condat
 de La Coste
 Couanac
 des Doyens
 Geniez
 la Grézette
 Grugnac
 Les Junies
 Labastide
 Lacapelle-Marival
 Lacoste
 Larnagol
 Larroque-Toirac
 Lastours
 Luzech
 Masclat
 Mayrac
 Mercuès
 Montbrun
 Montcléra
 Nadaillac-de-Rouge
 la Pannonie
 Pechrigal
 Pestillac
 Puy-Launay
 Rocamadour
 Saignes
 Saint-Laurent-les-Tours
 Saint-Sulpice
 Saint-Thamar
 Théron
 Vaillac

 Lozère (48)

Apcher
 le Boy
 Calberte
 la Caze
 le Champ
 Florac
 Grèzes
 Luc
 Miral
 Montjézieu
 Saint-Alban
 Saint-Julien-d'Arpaon
 Saint-Saturnin
 le Tournel

 Pyrénées-Orientales (66)

Belpuig
 Castelnou
 Château Royal de Collioure
 Château Vicomtal Saint-Pierre de Fenouillet
 Palais des Rois de Majorque
 Fort de Salses
 Ultrère

 Tarn (81)

Castelnau-de-Lévis
 Montespieu
 Padiès

 Tarn-et-Garonne (82)

Bruniquel

(→Top)

Hauts-de-France

 Aisne (02)

Château-Thierry
 Coucy
 Fère-en-Tardenois
 La Ferté-Milon
 Guise
 Septmonts

 Nord (59)

Montmorency
 Nicolas d'Avesnes

 Oise (60)

Pierrefonds
 Montataire

 Pas-de-Calais (62)

Bailleulmont
 Boulogne
 Fort Risban (Calais)
 Citadel of Calais 
 Hardelot
 Olhain
 Somme (80)

Boves
 Eaucourt-sur-Somme
 Folleville
 Ham
 Péronne
 Picquigny
 Rambures

(→Top)

Normandy

 Calvados (14)

Beaumont-le-Richard
 Caen
 Colombières
 Courcy
 Creully
 Falaise
 Olivet
 Sassy
 Vire

 Eure (27)

Château Gaillard
 Château-sur-Epte
 Conches-en-Ouche
 Gisors
 Harcourt
 Ivry-la-Bataille
 Fort de Limaie
 Lyons-la-Forêt
 Les Tourelles
 Vernon (Archives)

 Manche (50)

Bricquebec
 Canisy
 Gratot
 Pirou
 Regnéville
 Saint-Sauveur-le-Vicomte

 Orne (61)

Carrouges
 Domfront   
 Ducs d'Alençon
Château de la Motte, Joué du Plain

 Seine-Maritime (76)

Arques-la-Bataille
 Dieppe
 Ételan
 Fécamp
 Lillebonne
 Orcher
 Robert le Diable
 Rouen
 Tancarville

(→Top)

Pays de la Loire

 Loire-Atlantique (44)

Ancenis
 Blain
 Careil 
 ducs de Bretagne
 Châteaubriant
 Clisson 
 Goulaine
 La Motte-Glain 
 Pornic
 Ranrouët

 Maine-et-Loire (49)

Angers
 Baugé
 Bourmont
 Brézé
 Brissac
 Montreuil-Bellay
 Montsoreau
 Plessis-Bourré
 Pouancé
 Saumur

 Mayenne (53)

Bois Thibault
 Bouillé
 La Courbe
 Courtaliéru
 Lassay
 Laval
 Mayenne
 Montjean
 Mortiercrolles
 Sainte-Suzanne
 Thorigné-en-Charnie

 Sarthe (72)

Ballon

 Vendée (85)

Apremont
 Noirmoutier
 Pouzauges
 Puy du Fou
 Sainte-Hermine
 Tiffauges
 Vouvant (Tour Mélusine)
 Île d'Yeu

(→Top)

Provence-Alpes-Côte d’Azur

 Alpes-de-Haute-Provence (04)

Sisteron

 Hautes-Alpes (05)

Fort Queyras

 Alpes-Maritimes (06)

Antibes
 Gourdon
 Gréolières
 Lucéram
 La Napoule
 Nice
 Roquebrune-Cap-Martin
 Roquefort-les-Pins

 Bouches-du-Rhône (13)

Baux
 L'Empéri
 If
 Ners
 Tarascon
 Vernègues

 Var (83)

Pontevès

 Vaucluse (84)

Beaumont le Vieux
 Crestet
 Entrechaux
 Lacoste
 Lourmarin
 Mornas
 Murs
 Thouzon

(→Top)

List of former regions
 List of castles in Alsace
 List of castles in Champagne-Ardenne
 List of castles in Limousin
 List of castles in Nord-Pas-de-Calais
 List of castles in Picardy

See also
 Château
 List of châteaux in France
 List of castles

 
France
Castles
France
Castles